Socialist Refoundation Party (SYKP) is a socialist feminist political party in Turkey. It was founded on 24 June 2013 as a merger of far-left factions Social Freedom Party Initiative, Workers' Socialist Party, Socialist Future Party Initiative, and the Movement for Socialist Unity. Latter, Social Freedom Party Initiative broke away from the SYKP foundation process and later evolved into Social Freedom Party. Party has a tri-coloured star as its logo, red representing socialism, purple for feminism and green for environment.

The party is one of the participants in the People's Democratic Congress (HDK), a political initiative instrumental in founding the Peoples' Democratic Party in 2012.

References

2013 establishments in Turkey
Socialist parties in Turkey
Feminist parties in Turkey
Far-left politics in Turkey
Peoples' Democratic Congress
Political parties established in 2013
Progressive International
Socialist feminist organizations